Westside is an American music reality television show on Netflix. The eight-episode first season was released on November 9, 2018. The series follows the journey of nine musicians exploring the music industry, trying to break through and become stars. As the cast members work to improve their notability, they work with producers and agents to create original music videos and prepare for a nightclub performance in Los Angeles.

Cast 

 Alexandra Kay
 Taz Zavala
 Caitlin Ary
 James Byous
 Arika Gluck
 Keith Harrison
 Austin Kolbe
 Sean Patrick Murray
 Pia Toscano
 Leo Gallo

Episodes

Soundtrack 
A soundtrack for the series was released in 2018 by Warner Bros. Records. The soundtrack contains group performances and solos songs.

References

External links 
 
 

2018 American television series debuts
2010s American reality television series
2010s American music television series
English-language Netflix original programming